Chitra Bhattacharya (1926November 29, 2010) was a member of parliament of Bangladesh Jatya Sangsad. She was appointed from Tangail for the seat reserved for women in 1996 as an Awami League candidate.

Early life and career

Bhattacharya was born to a Zamindar family in Netrakona. She passed matriculation examination from Rangpur and intermediate from Ananda Mohan College in Mymensingh. She later earned a master's degree on Sociology from University of Dhaka.

Personal life
Bhattacharya was married to Justice Debesh Bhattacharya. They had three childreneconomist Debapriya Bhattacharya, physicist Debadarshi Bhattacharya and Debalina Roy.

References

1926 births
2010 deaths
University of Dhaka alumni
Women members of the Jatiya Sangsad
Awami League politicians
People from Netrokona District
20th-century Bangladeshi women politicians
Bengali Hindus
Bangladeshi Hindus